The year 1559 in science and technology included a number of events, some of which are listed here.

Botany
 First account of tulips in western Europe, by Conrad Gessner who describes them flowering in Augsburg, Bavaria, in the garden of Councillor Herwart.

Exploration
 March – Juan Fernández Ladrillero completes a double transit of the Straits of Magellan from the west.
 August 15 – Led by Don Tristán de Luna y Arellano, a Spanish missionary colony of 1500 men on thirteen ships arrives from Vera Cruz at Pensacola Bay, founding the first European settlement on the mainland United States. On September 19, the colony is decimated by a hurricane.
 , edited by Giovanni Battista Ramusio, is published posthumously in Venice, the first scholarly edition of The Travels of Marco Polo.

Pharmacology
 Jacques Besson publishes his first treatise, in Zurich, De absoluta ratione extrahendi olea et aquas e medicamentis simplicibus ("on the complete doctrine of extracting oils and waters from simple drugs"), with an introduction by Conrad Gessner, before moving to Geneva.

Physiology and medicine

 Shortly before his death, Italian anatomist Realdo Colombo publishes his only work De Re Anatomica, including his discovery of pulmonary circulation, of the clitoris and of the position and posture of the human embryo.
 Jean Nicot, French ambassador to Portugal 1559–61, describes the medicinal properties of tobacco which he introduces in the form of snuff to the French court.

Births

Deaths
 March 30 - Adam Ries, German mathematician (born 1492)
 Realdo Colombo, Italian anatomist (born 1516)
 approx. date - Leonard Digges, English mathematician and surveyor (born c. 1515)

References

 
16th century in science
1550s in science